Hum Dono Hain Alag Alag is an Indian television series that aired on STAR One from 13 July 2009 to 11 December 2009.Hum Dono Hain Alag Alag is a story of two odd couples, how they come together, their conflicts and how they work around the strange situation in which they find themselves.

Plot
Varun "Tappu" (Yash Pandit), the oldest son of the Kothari family, has had his proposal of marriage rejected — the 22nd time this has happened to him. At the same time, his younger brother Aditya "Adi" (Manish Raisinghania) and his girlfriend, Mallika, are in a restaurant to celebrate the first anniversary of their relationship. Through all this, Avantika (Dimple Jhangiani) is at her house and describes her dream man to her friends and grandfather, Omkar. The show also introduces Rajshree (Harsha Khandeparkar), who is the Kothari family's neighbour and their daughter's best friend. She has had feelings for Adi since childhood.

Tappu sees Avantika at a restaurant and falls for her at first sight. He tells Adi that he is in love with Avantika but doesn't know her name. They plan a sale in their saree store where she is sure to come so that Tappu can find out her name.

Adi, with the help of Mallika, trains Tappu on how to impress a girl. Tappu is due to meet Mallika at a park but when she arrives Tappu, being nervous, walks away. Avantika notices Tappu but can't make out his face.

Avantika visits the sale in the saree store, and Tappu fails to talk to her. Avantika, who is still dreaming of the man in the park, visits his house by chance.

Meanwhile, with Adi totally in love with Mallika, his mother, Adu, sees that Rajshree loves Adi and makes her admit it. She proposes Rajshree as Adi's bride to his father, Mafatlal. He agrees thinking Anu is talking about Mallika. Rajshree is heartbroken when Adi declares Mallika as his life partner.

With their agreement, Mafatlal agrees to wed Adi and Mallika on the same day as Tappu and Avantika.

Tappu realizes that Avantika loves a part of Tappu, his avatar at the date (which doesn't exist anymore) and writes her a letter telling the truth. But the letter gets in the hands of Omkar before Avantika.

Cast
 Yash Pandit as Varun "Tappu" Kothari
 Dimple Jhangiani as Avantika "Avi" Trivedi
 Manish Raisinghania as Aditya "Adi" Kothari
 Harsha Khandeparkar as  Rajshree Goradia
 Mafatlal Kothari(Varun's father)
 Anu Kothari(Varun's Mother)
 Parvati "Paro" Kothari(Varun's younger sister) 
 Jimit Trivedi as Gajendra "Gajju" Garodia(Varun's best friend) 
 Mallika(Aditya's girlfriend)
 Omkar/Daddu(Avantika's grandfather)

References

External links
 Official Website 

Hindi comedy shows
Star One (Indian TV channel) original programming
Indian television soap operas
2009 Indian television series debuts
2009 Indian television series endings